The cloud cisticola or tink-tink cisticola (Cisticola textrix) is a species of bird in the family Cisticolidae. It is found in Angola, Eswatini, Lesotho, Mozambique, South Africa, and Zambia, and its natural habitat is subtropical or tropical dry lowland grassland.

References

External links
 Cloud cisticola - Species text in The Atlas of Southern African Birds.

cloud cisticola
Birds of Central Africa
Birds of Southern Africa
cloud cisticola
Taxa named by Louis Jean Pierre Vieillot
Taxonomy articles created by Polbot